The Bosnian genocide refers to either the Srebrenica massacre or the wider crimes against humanity and ethnic cleansing campaign throughout areas controlled by the Army of Republika Srpska (VRS) during the Bosnian War of 1992–1995. The events in Srebrenica in 1995 included the killing of more than 8,000 Bosniak (Bosnian Muslim) men and boys, as well as the mass expulsion of another 25,000–30,000 Bosniak civilians by VRS units under the command of General Ratko Mladić.

The ethnic cleansing that took place in VRS-controlled areas targeted Bosniaks and Bosnian Croats. The ethnic cleansing campaign included extermination, unlawful confinement, mass rape, sexual assault, torture, plunder and destruction of private and public property, and inhumane treatment of civilians; the targeting of political leaders, intellectuals, and professionals; the unlawful deportation and transfer of civilians; the unlawful shelling of civilians; the unlawful appropriation and plunder of real and personal property; the destruction of homes and businesses; and the destruction of places of worship. The acts have been found to have satisfied the requirements for "guilty acts" of genocide, and that, "some physical perpetrators held the intent to physically destroy the protected groups of Bosnian Muslims and Croats".

In the 1990s, several authorities asserted that ethnic cleansing as carried out by elements of the Bosnian Serb army was genocide. These included a resolution by the United Nations General Assembly and three convictions for genocide in German courts (the convictions were based upon a wider interpretation of genocide than that used by international courts). In 2005, the United States Congress passed a resolution declaring that the Serbian policies of aggression and ethnic cleansing meet the terms defining genocide.

The Srebrenica massacre was found to be an act of genocide by the International Criminal Tribunal for the Former Yugoslavia, a finding upheld by the ICJ. On 24 March 2016, former Bosnian Serb leader and the first president of the Republika Srpska, Radovan Karadžić, was found guilty of genocide in Srebrenica, war crimes, and crimes against humanity and sentenced to 40 years in prison. In 2019 an appeals court increased his sentence to life imprisonment. On 12 May 2021, it was announced that, in an agreement with UK authorities, he would serve the rest of his sentence in a UK prison.

United Nations

On 18 December 1992, the U.N. General Assembly resolution 47/121 in its preamble deemed ethnic cleansing to be a form of genocide stating:

On 12 July 2007, in its judgement on the Jorgić v. Germany case, the European Court of Human Rights noted that:

International Criminal Tribunal for the Former Yugoslavia

Finding of genocide at Srebrenica

In 2001, the International Criminal Tribunal for the Former Yugoslavia (ICTY) judged that the 1995 Srebrenica massacre was genocide. In the unanimous ruling Prosecutor v. Krstić, the Appeals Chamber of the International Criminal Tribunal for the former Yugoslavia (ICTY), located in The Hague, reaffirmed that the Srebrenica massacre was genocide, the Presiding Judge Theodor Meron stating:

In September 2006, former Bosnian Serb leader Momcilo Krajišnik was found guilty of multiple instances of crimes against humanity, but while the ICTY judges found that there was evidence that crimes committed in Bosnia constituted the criminal act of genocide (actus reus), they did not establish that the accused possessed genocidal intent, or was part of a criminal enterprise that had such an intent (mens rea).

In 2007, the court found insufficient evidence to conclude on alleged genocidal intent.

Finding of genocide at Žepa
In the case of Tolimir, in the first degree verdict, the International Criminal Tribunal has concluded that genocide was committed in the enclave of Žepa, outside of Srebrenica. However, that conviction was overturned by the appeals chamber, which narrowed the crime of genocide only to Srebrenica.

Milošević trial
On 16 June 2004, in Prosecutor v. Slobodan Milošević: Decision on Motion for Judgement of Acquittal, the ICTY Trial Chamber refused to acquit former Serbian president Slobodan Milošević on the same grounds, and ruled:

On 26 February 2007, however, in the Bosnian genocide case, the United Nations International Court of Justice (ICJ) found that there was no evidence linking Serbia under the rule of Milošević to genocide committed by Bosnian Serbs in the Bosnian War. However, the court did find that Milošević and others in Serbia did not do enough to prevent acts of genocide from occurring in Srebrenica.

On 22 November 2017, an International court in The Hague found General Ratko Mladić guilty of one count of genocide, five counts of crimes against humanity and four counts of violations of the laws or customs of war. He was found not guilty of one count of genocide and sentenced to life imprisonment.

Bosnian Genocide Trial
Currently, former Bosnian Serb leaders Radovan Karadžić and Ratko Mladić were both on trial on two counts of genocide and other war crimes committed in Srebrenica, Prijedor, Ključ, and other municipalities of Bosnia. Karadžić and Mladić are charged, separately, with:

Count 1: Genocide.
 Municipalities: Bratunac, Foča, Ključ, Kotor Varoš, Prijedor, Sanski Most, Vlasenica and Zvornik. Initially dismissed by the Trial Chamber on 28 June 2012, this count was unanimously reinstated on 11 July 2013 by the Appeals Chamber. The Appeals Chamber concluded, inter alia, that the Trial Chamber erred by finding that evidence adduced by the Prosecution was incapable of proving certain types of genocidal acts as well as relevant genocidal intent by Karadžić.

Count 2: Genocide.
 Municipality: Srebrenica.

Count 3: Persecutions on Political, Racial and Religious Grounds, a Crime Against Humanity.
 Municipalities: Banja Luka, Bijeljina, Bosanska Krupa, Bosanski Novi, Bratunac, Brčko, Foča, Hadžići, Ilidža, Kalinovik, Ključ, Kotor Varoš, Novi Grad, Novo Sarajevo, Pale, Prijedor, Rogatica, Sanski Most, Sokolac, Trnovo, Vlasenica, Vogošća, Zvornik and Srebrenica.

They are also charged with murder, deportation, inhumane acts, spreading terror among civilians, unlawful attacks on civilians, and taking of hostages.

Involvement of Serbia
The UN's highest court has cleared Serbia of direct responsibility for genocide during the 1990s Bosnian war.
But the International Court of Justice did rule that Belgrade had violated international law by failing to prevent the 1995 massacre at Srebrenica.

On 28 February 2013, the ICTY Court of Appeals overturned a conviction for JNA (Yugoslav National Army) Chief of Staff Momčilo Perišić for crimes committed in Bosnia and Herzegovina and Croatia and ordered Perišić's immediate release. His acquittal means that, to date, no official or army officer of Serbia-Montenegro (Yugoslavia) and no member of the JNA or VJ high command has ever been convicted by the ICTY for war-crimes committed in Bosnia.

On 30 May 2013, the ICTY acquitted and ordered the immediate release of Jovica Stanišić and Franko Simatović, two close aides of Slobodan Milošević. Stanišić was the Chief of the Serbian State Security Service, while Simatović was in charge of the special operations arm of the State Security Service.

United States House and Senate resolutions
The month before the 10th anniversary of the Srebrenica Massacre, both houses of the United States Congress passed similarly worded resolutions asserting that the policies of aggression and ethnic cleansing as implemented by Serb forces in Bosnia and Herzegovina from 1992 to 1995, including the Srebrenica Massacre, constituted genocide.

On 27 June 2005, during the 109th Congress, the United States House of Representatives passed a resolution (H. Res. 199 sponsored by Congressman Christopher Smith with 39 cosponsors) commemorating the 10th anniversary of the Srebrenica genocide. The resolution, as amended, was passed with an overwhelming majority of 370 – YES votes, 1 – NO vote, and 62 – ABSENT. The resolution is a bipartisan measure commemorating 11 July 1995 – 2005, the tenth anniversary of the Srebrenica massacre. The Senate version, S.Res.134, was sponsored by Senator Gordon Smith with 8 cosponsors and was agreed to in the Senate on 22 June 2005 without amendment and with unanimous consent. The summaries of the resolutions are identical, with the exception of the name of the house passing the resolution, and the substitution of the word executed for murdered by the House in the first clause:

International Court of Justice (ICJ): Bosnia and Herzegovina v. Serbia and Montenegro

A trial took place before the International Court of Justice (ICJ), following a 1993 suit by Bosnia and Herzegovina against Serbia and Montenegro alleging genocide. On 26 February 2007, the ICJ, in the Bosnian Genocide Case concurred with the ICTY's earlier finding that the Srebrenica massacre constituted genocide:

ICJ President Rosalyn Higgins noted that there was much evidence to prove that crimes against humanity and war crimes had been committed in Bosnia and Herzegovina such as widespread killings, the siege of towns, mass rapes, torture, deportation to camps and detention centres, but the ICJ did not have jurisdiction over them, because the case dealt "exclusively with genocide in a limited legal sense and not in the broader sense sometimes given to this term". Moreover, the Court found "that Serbia has not committed genocide" nor "conspired to" or "incited the commission of genocide". It did however, find that Serbia had failed "to take all measures within its power to prevent genocide in Srebrenica" and to comply fully with the ICTY by failing to transfer Ratko Mladić to the custody of the ICTY in the Hague and that Serbia must in future transfer to the Hague all ICTY-indicted individuals, who reside under Serbian jurisdiction.

Criticism of the ICJ judgement
The Court's finding that Serbia was not directly involved in the Srebrenica genocide have been strongly criticized. Prof. Yuval Shany, Hersch Lauterpacht Professor of Public International Law at the Hebrew University of Jerusalem, described the Court's conclusions on the three questions before it as controversial:

Antonio Cassese, the first president of the International Criminal Tribunal for the former Yugoslavia, criticized the ICJ judgement on the ground that "The International Court has set an unrealistically high standard of proof for finding Serbia complicit in genocide." He added:

The vice-president of the International Court of Justice, Judge Al-Khasawneh, criticized the judgement as not reflecting the evidence with respect to Serbia's direct responsibility for genocide at Srebrenica:

The 'effective control' test for attribution established in the Nicaragua case is not suitable to questions of State responsibility for international crimes committed with a common purpose. The 'overall control' test for attribution established in the Tadić case is more appropriate when the commission of international crimes is the common objective of the controlling State and the non-State actors. The Court's refusal to infer genocidal intent from a consistent pattern of conduct in Bosnia and Herzegovina is inconsistent with the established jurisprudence of the ICTY. The FRY's knowledge of the genocide set to unfold in Srebrenica is clearly established. The Court should have treated the Scorpions as a de jure organ of the FRY. The statement by the Serbian Council of Ministers in response to the massacre of Muslim men by the Scorpions amounted to an admission of responsibility. The Court failed to appreciate the definitional complexity of the crime of genocide and to assess the facts before it accordingly.

Missing SDC Records
The International Criminal Tribunal never received a complete archive of the Supreme Defense Council minutes from Serbia. According to the explanation given by Sir Geoffrey Nice, former prosecutor in the trial of Slobodan Milošević:

First, it is important to note that Serbia did not hand over to the Prosecution (OTP) the complete collection of SDC [Supreme Defense Council] records. For example, for the year 1995 the OTP received recordings for only about half of all the sessions held by SDC. Further, some of the SDC records were not handed over in their full stenographically recorded form but were produced as extended minutes. That means that they were shorter than steno-notes but longer than the regular minutes. The dates of the missing meetings or the meetings where this lesser form of record was provided, as I recall, were significant – namely dates leading up to, surrounding and in the aftermath of the Srebrenica massacre. The full records of those meetings need yet to be provided. At the same time, these documents, significant as they are, do not constitute a single body of evidence that will explain once and for all what happened and who was culpable. They do provide a much fuller context and provide some very valuable testimonials of things that were said by Milošević and others. In their un-redacted form they would point all who are interested (not just governments and lawyers) to other documents that have never been provided and that might well be more candid than the words of those at the SD Council meetings who knew they were being recorded by a stenographer. Second, it should also be remembered that there are other protected document collections and individual documents which were, and still are, protected by direct agreements between Belgrade and the former OTP Prosecutor, i.e. they were not protected by the Trial Chamber. These documents are difficult now to identify but if and when Bosnia-Herzegovina decides to reopen the ICJ case it will be essential to require Serbia and/or the ICTY to produce all those documents for the ICJ.

European Court of Human Rights

The Higher Regional Court of Düsseldorf, Germany, in September 1997, handed down a genocide conviction against Nikola Jorgić, a Bosnian Serb who was the leader of a paramilitary group located in the Doboj region. He was sentenced to four terms of life imprisonment for his involvement in genocidal actions that took place in regions of Bosnia and Herzegovina, other than Srebrenica.

In a judgement issued on 12 July 2007, the European Court of Human Rights (ECHR) in the Jorgić v. Germany case (Application no. 74613/01), reviewed the German court's judgements against Jorgić. In rejecting Jorgić's appeal, the ECHR affirmed that the German court's ruling was consistent with an interpretation of the Genocide Convention foreseeable at the time Jorgić committed the offence in 1992. However, the ECHR highlighted that the German court's ruling, based upon German domestic law, had interpreted the crime of genocide more broadly than and in a manner since rejected by international courts. Under the wider definition that the German judiciary upheld, the ethnic cleansing carried out by Jorgić was a genocide because it was an intent to destroy the group as a social unit, and although the majority of scholars took the view that German genocide law should interpret genocide as the physical-biological destruction of the protected group, "a considerable number of scholars were of the opinion that the notion of destruction of a group as such, in its literal meaning, was wider than a physical-biological extermination and also encompassed the destruction of a group as a social unit".

In the case of Prosecutor v. Krstić (2 August 2001), the ICTY ruled "customary international law limits the definition of genocide to those acts seeking the physical or biological destruction of all or part of the group. Hence, an enterprise attacking only the cultural or sociological characteristics of a human group in order to annihilate these elements which give to that group its own identity distinct from the rest of the community would not fall under the definition of genocide". On 19 April 2004, this determination was upheld on appeal: "The Genocide Convention, and customary international law in general, prohibit only the physical or biological destruction of a human group. ... The Trial Chamber expressly acknowledged this limitation, and eschewed any broader definition. ... " although like the lower court, the appeal court also ruled that ethnic cleansing might with other evidence lead to an inference of genocidal intent. On 14 January 2000, the ICTY ruled in the Prosecutor v. Kupreškić and Others case that the Lašva Valley ethnic cleansing campaign in order to expel the Bosnian Muslim population from the region was persecution, not genocide per se. The ECHR noted the opinion of the International Court of Justice ruling in the Bosnian Genocide Case that ethnic cleansing is not in and of itself genocide.

In reference to legal writers, the ECHR also noted: "Amongst scholars, the majority have taken the view that ethnic cleansing, in the way in which it was carried out by the Serb forces in Bosnia and Herzegovina in order to expel Muslims and Croats from their homes, did not constitute genocide. However, there are also a considerable number of scholars who have suggested that these acts did amount to genocide".

The ECHR having reviewed the case and the more recent international rulings on the issue the ECHR ruled that "The Court finds that the [German] courts' interpretation of 'intent to destroy a group' as not necessitating a physical destruction of the group, which has also been adopted by a number of scholars ... , is therefore covered by the wording, read in its context, of the crime of genocide in the [German] Criminal Code and does not appear unreasonable", so "In view of the foregoing, the [ECHR] concludes that, while many authorities had favoured a narrow interpretation of the crime of genocide, there had already been several authorities at the material time which had construed the offence of genocide in the same wider way as the German courts. In these circumstances, the [ECHR] finds that [Jorgić], if need be with the assistance of a lawyer, could reasonably have foreseen that he risked being charged with and convicted of genocide for the acts he had committed in 1992.", and for this reason the court rejected Jorgić's assertion that there had been a breach of Article 7 (no punishment without law) of the European Convention on Human Rights by Germany.

European Parliament
On 15 January 2009, the European Parliament passed a resolution calling on the European Union's executive authorities to commemorate 11 July as a day of remembrance and mourning of the 1995 Srebrenica genocide, explicitly recognized as such with reference to the ICJ decision. The resolution also reiterated a number of findings including the number of victims as "more than 8,000 Muslim men and boys" executed and "nearly 25,000 women, children and elderly people were forcibly deported, making this event the biggest war crime to take place in Europe since the end of the Second World War". The resolution passed overwhelmingly, on a vote of 556 to 9.

Individuals prosecuted for genocide during the Bosnian War

About 30 people have been indicted for participating in genocide or complicity in genocide during the early 1990s in Bosnia. To date, after several plea bargains and some convictions that were successfully challenged on appeal, two men, Vujadin Popović and Ljubiša Beara, have been found guilty of genocide, and two others, Radislav Krstić and Drago Nikolić, have been found guilty of aiding and abetting genocide, by an international court for their participation in the Srebrenica massacre.

Four have been found guilty of participating in genocides in Bosnia by German courts, one of whom, Nikola Jorgić, lost an appeal against his conviction in the European Court of Human Rights.

On 29 July 2008, the State Court of Bosnia and Herzegovina found Milenko Trifunović, Brano Džinić, Aleksandar Radovanović, Miloš Stupar, Branislav Medan and Petar Mitrović guilty of genocide for their part in the Srebrenica massacre, and on 16 October 2009 the State Court of Bosnia and Herzegovina found Milorad Trbić, a former member of the Bosnian Serb security forces, guilty of genocide for his participation in the genocide in the Srebrenica massacre.

Slobodan Milošević, the former President of Serbia and of Yugoslavia, was the most senior political figure to stand trial at the ICTY. He was charged with having committed genocide, either alone or in concert with other named members of a joint criminal enterprise. The indictment accused him of planning, preparing and executing the destruction, in whole or in part, of the Bosnian Muslim national, ethnical, racial or religious groups, as such, in territories within Bosnia and Herzegovina including Bijeljina, Bosanski Novi, Brčko, Ključ, Kotor Varoš, Prijedor, Sanski Most and Srebrenica. He died during his trial, on 11 March 2006, and no verdict was returned.

The ICTY had issued a warrant for the arrest of Radovan Karadžić and Ratko Mladić on several charges including genocide. Karadžić was arrested in Belgrade on 21 July 2008, and was transferred into ICTY custody in the Hague nine days later on 30 July. Ratko Mladić was also arrested in Serbia on 26 May 2011 after a decade in hiding.

On 24 March 2016, Karadžić was sentenced to 40 years in prison. Finally, on 22 November 2017, Mladić was sentenced to a life in prison. Both were sentenced for war crimes, crimes against humanity and genocide. Both Karadžić and Mladić appealed their convictions. In 2019 appeals judges increased Karadžić's sentence to life in prison. A verdict in Mladić's appeal was expected in June 2021. It was rejected on 8 June with Mladic's sentence affirmed by a panel of U.N. judges in a four to one vote.

Death toll

If a narrow definition of genocide is used, as favoured by the international courts, then during the Srebrenica massacre, 8,000 Bosnian Muslim men and boys were murdered and the remainder of the population (between 25,000 and 30,000 Bosniak women, children and elderly people) was forced to leave the area. If a wider definition is used, then the number is much larger. According to the ICTY Demographic Unit, an estimated 69.8% or 25,609 of the civilians killed in the war were Bosniak (with 42,501 military deaths), with the Bosnian Serbs suffering 7,480 civilian casualties (15,299 military deaths), the Bosnian Croats suffering 1,675 civilian casualties (7,183 military deaths), amounting to a total of 104,732 casualties, spread between the Bosnian Croats (8.5%), Bosnian Serbs (21.7%), Bosniaks (65%), and others (4.8%).

In January 2013, the Sarajevo-based Research and Documentation Center (RDC) published its final results on "the most comprehensive" research into Bosnia-Herzegovina's war casualties: The Bosnian Book of the Dead – a database that reveals "a minimum of" 97,207 names of Bosnia and Herzegovina's citizens killed and missing during the 1992–1995 war. The head of the ICTY Demographic Unit, Ewa Tabeu, has called it "the largest existing database on Bosnian war victims". More than 240,000 pieces of data were collected, processed, checked, compared and evaluated by an international team of experts to tabulate the names of the victims. According to the RDC, 82% or 33,071 of the civilians killed in the war were Bosniak, with a minimum of 97,207 casualties, military and civilian, for all sides involved: Bosniaks (66.2%), Serbs (25.4%) and Croats (7.8%), as well as others (0.5%).

George Szamuely's Bombs for Peace estimates that the number of Muslims fleeing from Srebrenica to Tuzla in a mixed military-civilian column after the city was abandoned by order of Bosnian commanders was perhaps 12,000-15,000, and that of these, as few as 1,000 or less died as they fought their way through Serb lines.

In addition to those known to be outright killed, around 10,500 people are still missing with unknown fates due to the Bosnian War; most of them are Bosniaks.

In a statement on 23 September 2008 to the United Nations, Dr. Haris Silajdžić, as head of the Bosnia and Herzegovina delegation to the United Nations 63rd Session of the General Assembly, said that "according to ICRC data, 200,000 people were killed, 12,000 of them children, up to 50,000 women were raped, and 2.2 million were forced to flee their homes. This was a veritable genocide and sociocide". However, such estimations have been criticized as highly inaccurate and analysts such as George Kenney have accused the Bosnian government and the international community of sensationalism and of deliberately inflating the number of fatalities to attract international support for the Muslims.

Controversy and denial

While the majority of international opinion accepts the findings of the international courts, there remains some disagreement about the extent of the genocide and to what degree Serbia was involved.

The Bosnian Muslim community asserts that the Srebrenica massacre was just one instance of what was a broader genocide committed by Serbia.

The International Court of Justice veered away from the factual and legal findings of the ICTY Appeals Chamber in the Duško Tadić case. In the judgment delivered in July 1999, the Appeals Chamber found that the Army of Republika Srpska was "under overall control" of Belgrade and the Yugoslav Army, which meant that they had funded, equipped and assisted in the coordination and the planning of military operations. Had the International Court of Justice accepted this finding of the Tribunal, Serbia would have been found guilty of complicity in the Srebrenica genocide. Instead it concluded that the Appeals Chamber in the Tadic case "did not attempt to determine the responsibility of a state but individual criminal responsibility". Paradoxical as it may be, the outcome of this legal suit filed back in March 1993 arrived too early for Bosnia and Herzegovina. Radovan Karadžić arrest came over a year after the ICJ gave its judgement, and Ratko Mladić, also accused of genocide, was arrested in May 2011. Slobodan Milošević died during his trial and three trials of former Serb officials have just started.

Although the ICTY prosecutors had access to them during the trials, some of the minutes of wartime meetings of Yugoslavia's political and military leaders, were not made public as the ICTY accepted the Serbian argument that to do so would damage Serbia's national security. Although the ICJ could have subpoenaed the documents directly from Serbia, it did not do so and relied instead on those made public during the ICTY trials. Two of the ICJ judges criticised this decision in strongly worded dissents. Marlise Simons reporting on this in The New York Times, states that "When the documents were handed over [to the ICTY], the lawyers said, a team from Belgrade made it clear in letters to the tribunal and in meetings with prosecutors and judges that it wanted the documents expurgated to keep them from harming Serbia's case at the International Court of Justice. The Serbs made no secret of that even as they argued their case for 'national security,' said one of the lawyers, adding, 'The senior people here [at the ICTY] knew about this'.". Simons continues that Rosalyn Higgins the president of the ICJ, declined to comment when asked why the full records had not been subpoenaed, saying that "The ruling speaks for itself". Diane Orentlicher, a law professor at American University in Washington, commented "Why didn't the court request the full documents? The fact that they were blacked out clearly implies these passages would have made a difference.", and William Schabas, a professor of international law at the University of Ireland in Galway, suggested that as a civil rather than a criminal court, the ICJ was more used to relying on materials put before it than aggressively pursuing evidence which might lead to a diplomatic incident.

Denial

Writers, including Edward S. Herman, believe that the Srebrenica massacre was not genocide. They cite that women and children were largely spared and that only military age men were targeted. This view is not supported by the findings of the ICJ or the ICTY.
According to Sonja Biserko, president of the Helsinki Committee for Human Rights in Serbia, and Edina Bećirević, the faculty of criminology and security studies of the University of Sarajevo:

See also
 Outline of Genocide studies
Srebrenica massacre
Bosniaks
Command responsibility
Genocides in history
Republika Srpska
Serbian war crimes in the Yugoslav Wars

Footnotes

References

Other sources

Max Bergholz. Violence as a Generative Force: Identity, Nationalism, and Memory in a Balkan Community. Ithac, Cornell University Press, 2016. 464 pp. $35.00 (cloth), .
 Genocide in Bosnia-Herzegovina: Hearing before the Commission on Security and Cooperation in Europe,United States, 1995..
 Paul R. Bartrop, Bosnian Genocide: The Essential Reference Guide,Greenwood Press, 2016..
 Walasek Helen, Bosnia and the destruction of cultural heritage, Routledge, 2015.  .
 Donia Robert. J, Radovan Karadžić : Architect of the Bosnian Genocide, Cambridge University Press, 2014, .
 Roy Gutman, A witness to genocide, Prentice Hall & IBD, 1993, .
 Cigar, Norman, Genocide in Bosnia: The Policy of "Ethnic Cleansing", 1995, Texas A & M University Press, 1995.. 
 Allen, Beverly, Rape Warfare: The Hidden Genocide in Bosnia-Herzegovina and Croatia. Minneapolis: University of Minnesota Press,1996. .
 Ching Jackie, Genocide and the Bosnian War, Rosen Publishing Group, 2008. .
 Edina Bećirević, Genocide on the Drina River, New Haven and London: Yale University Press, 2014, .
 Michael Anthony Sells, The Bridge Betrayed: Religion and Genocide in Bosnia, Berkeley: University of California Press, 1998, .
 Attila Hoare Marko, Bosnia and Herzegovina: Genocide, Justice and Denial, Center for Advances Studies, 2015, .*
 Thomas Cushman and Stjepan Mestrovic, This Time We Knew: Western Responses to Genocide in Bosnia, New York University Press, 1996, .

Further reading
 Ed Vulliamy, The War Is Dead, Long Live the War: Bosnia: The Reckoning, Bodley Head (London, 19 April 2012) . Focusses on the camps.

External links

 America and the Bosnia Genocide by Mark Danner New York Review of Books, Volume 44, Number 19, 4 December 1997
 Bosnia Genocide Studies Program, at Yale University → latest archived on 7 July 2019
 Aegis Trust (genocide prevention trust) An independent international organisation dedicated to eliminating genocide
  Srebrenica – a 'Safe haven' Netherlands Institute for War Documentation, Srebrenica – a 'Safe haven', an extensive Dutch government report on events in eastern Bosnia and the fall of Srebrenica.
 Bosnia victims appeal Karadzic's Genocide Acquittal from Balkan Insight
 Leydesdorff, Selma. Surviving the Bosnian Genocide: The Women of Srebrenica Speak. Trans. Kay Richardson. Bloomington: Indiana University Press, 2011.
 Missing No Longer – International commission forges ahead to identify genocide victims, Scientific American, 1 August 2006
 Genocide-Bosnia at Peace Pledge Union Information website
 A review of the movie Storm, by director Hans-Christian Schmid (Screen Comment)

 
Anti-Muslim violence in Europe
Responsibility to protect
Serbian war crimes in the Bosnian War
Genocide
Genocide
Genocide
Genocide
Serbian nationalism
Ethnic cleansing in Europe
Bosnia and Herzegovina–Serbia relations
Serbian nationalism in Bosnia and Herzegovina
Genocides in Europe
Persecution of Muslims
Persecution of intellectuals